"Somebody Else's Guy" is a 1984 song written and popularized by Jocelyn Brown. On the US soul chart, the single peaked at number two and stalled at number 75 on the Hot 100, but in the UK it made the pop top 20. On the disco chart, "Somebody Else's Guy" peaked at number 13. It was the title track of Brown's debut solo album, released the same year.

Jocelyn Brown version

Track listing and formats
 U.S. 12" single, VND D01
 "Somebody Else's Guy" (Vocal 12" Version) - 6:28
 "Somebody Else's Guy" (Instrumental Dub) - 5:45

Charts

Certifications

CeCe Peniston version

In 1996, the song was covered by dance music singer CeCe Peniston for her studio album I'm Movin' On. In 1998, it was released as a single to promote Peniston's greatest hits collection, The Best of CeCe Peniston, an import compilation issued in 1998 only in Europe and Japan.

Both Brown in 1984,
and Peniston in 1998 reached the same chart position on the UK Top 75, peaking at number thirteen.

The single reached a Top 10 position on the UK Chart-Track list, peaking at number six in February.

Credits and personnel
 CeCe Peniston – lead/back vocal
 Karl "Tuff Enuff" Brown – additional producer, remix, remix engineer
 Matt "Jam" Lamont – additional producer, remix
 David Morales – additional producer, remix
 Manny Lehman – executive producer
 Mark Mazzetti – executive producer
 Darren Clowers – producer, keyboards
 Keith Andes – keyboards
 Rom Malco – drum programming
 Terry Burns – programming
 Joey Moskowitz – programming
 Tuff & Jam – remix engineers
 Vachik Aghaniantz – engineer, mix
 Dave "EQ3" Sussman – engineer
 Clowers Studios, Hollywood, CA – studio
 Hollywood Sound Recorders, Hollywood, CA – mix
 Jocelyn Brown Music (BMI) – publisher
 PolyGram International (ASCAP) – publisher

Additional credits
 "Finally"

Track listings and formats

 CD, DE, promo, #588 497-2
 "Somebody Else's Guy" (Classic Old School Radio Mix) — 3:47

 CD, DE, #582 114-2
 "Somebody Else's Guy" (Classic Old School Radio Mix) — 3:47
 "Somebody Else's Guy" (Hard House Dub) - 9:18

 12", UK, promo, #AMPMDJ 111
 "Somebody Else's Guy" (LP Version) - 5:37
 "Somebody Else's Guy" (Classic Old School 12" Mix) - 6:14

 CD, UK, promo, #GUYCD1
 "Somebody Else's Guy" (Classic Old School Radio Edit) — 3:29
 "Somebody Else's Guy" (Uplifting Club Edit) - 3:47
 "Somebody Else's Guy" (LP Edit) - 3:44

 12", UK, promo, #AMPMDJ 117 A
 "Somebody Else's Guy" (Tuff Jam's Classic Garage) — 7:27
 "Somebody Else's Guy" (TJ's Ladies Choice Dub)

 12", UK, #582 511 1
 "Somebody Else's Guy" (Tuff Jam's Classic Garage) — 7:27
 "Somebody Else's Guy" (TJ's Ladies Choice Dub)
 "Somebody Else's Guy" (LP Version)
 "Somebody Else's Guy" (Kupper's Uplifting Club Mix)

 12", UK, promo, #DJ117
 "Somebody Else's Guy" (Tuff Jam's Classic Garage)
 "Somebody Else's Guy" (TJ's Ladies Choice Dub)
 "Somebody Else's Guy" (Kupper's Uplifting Club Mix)
 "Somebody Else's Guy" (Kupper's Dark & Funky Mix)

 12", IT, #ZAC 137
 12", UK, promo, #588 500-1
 "Somebody Else's Guy" (Classic Old School 12" Mix) - 6:14
 "Somebody Else's Guy" (Classic Old School Instrument.) - 5:53
 "Somebody Else's Guy" (Hard House Dub) - 9:18
 "Somebody Else's Guy" (Classic Old School Radio Mix) — 3:47

 MCD, JP, #POCM-1234
 MCD, UK, #582 511-2
 MCD, UK, #582 517-2
 "Somebody Else's Guy" (Classic Old School Radio Edit) — 3:29
 "Somebody Else's Guy" (LP Version) - 5:37
 "Somebody Else's Guy" (Tuff Jam's Classic Garage) — 7:27
 "Finally" (Classic Funk Radio Mix) - 3:25

 MCS, UK, #582 511-4
 "Somebody Else's Guy" (Classic Old School Radio Edit) — 3:29
 "Somebody Else's Guy" (LP Version) - 5:37
 "Finally" (Classic Funk Radio Mix) - 3:25
 "Somebody Else's Guy" (Kupper's Uplifting Club Mix)

 MCD, DE, #582 115-2
 "Somebody Else's Guy" (Classic Old School Radio Mix) — 3:47
 "Somebody Else's Guy" (Classic Old School 12" Mix) - 6:14
 "Somebody Else's Guy" (LP Version)  — 5:37
 "Somebody Else's Guy" (Classic Old School Instrument.) - 5:53

Charts

Weekly charts

References

General

 Specific

External links
 
 

1984 singles
1998 singles
Post-disco songs
CeCe Peniston songs
Jocelyn Brown songs
1984 songs
Prelude Records (record label) singles
A&M Records singles
Torch songs